Hydrick is a surname.  Notable people with the surname include:

Daniel E. Hydrick (1860–1921), American judge
James Hydrick (born 1959), American performer and self-described psychic

See also
Reinhard Heydrich (1904–1942), high-ranking German Nazi official and Holocaust perpetrator
Heydrich (surname), a German surname
Heidrich, a German surname